Eva Maria Lewis is a student protester, advocate, poet, and artist. From South Side, Chicago, she is a contributor to Teen Vogue, founder of The I Project, Youth for Black Lives, and an organizer of the July 11, 2016 youth march on Millennium Park to protest police brutality.

Education 
Lewis is a graduate of Walter Payton College Prep, and a student at University of Pennsylvania.

Community activism 
After the shooting of Trayvon Martin, Lewis protested for the first time, marching with her mother on Michigan Avenue (Chicago). Lewis became further engaged while attending high school at Walter Payton College Prep, after attending primary school in the less-affluent, majority African American South Side. In 2015, when she was a junior in high school, Lewis founded the non-profit The I Project. The I Project supports intersectional activism through art, with fundraising and community outreach. Events have included a photo shoot for people of all sizes and shapes, with a discussion of culture and body image, and a screening of Beyoncé's Lemonade with inter-generational panel discussion.

In 2016, Lewis joined three other black teen women activists to organize a youth sit-in in Chicago, to protest police shootings of people of color, particularly Alton Sterling and Philando Castile. The organizers rallied young community members on social media, with a Facebook event and the hashtag #BLMCHIYouth. The four organizers led a crowd of over 1,000 (some sources say 2,000) people in a peaceful sit-in in Millennium Park, and a march down Michigan Avenue and State Street (Chicago). There were no arrests, a symbolic victory because of the reputation of violence in Chicago, especially among youth of color, and a strained relationship between anti-racism activists and Chicago police. Following the march, Lewis and the organizers started Youth for Black Lives (Y4BL) to activate youth voices against systemic oppression. With Y4BL, Lewis organized a second march beginning in Millennium Park on August 7, 2016, to protest police brutality following the death of Paul O'Neal. In November 2016, in response to a deadly shooting in Mount Greenwood, Chicago where Joshua Beal, 25, of Indianapolis brandished a gun and failed to drop it after being instructed by a police sergeant; and text messages sent among students of Marist High School (Chicago, Illinois), Y4BL organized another march. However, Lewis and the organizers received threats on social media, and CPS leadership contacted the organizers parents, and the march was cancelled due to safety concerns. Instead, Y4BL organized meetings with Chicago Police Department Superintendent Eddie T. Johnson. The first, held on November 11, 2016, included Johnson, the Chief of Patrol, the Alderman of Mt. Greenwood, and the principal of Marist High School. During the first and subsequent meetings, Lewis and the other Y4BL members questioned Johnson and discussed racism and policing in Mt. Greenwood and Chicago at large.

United Nations 
Through her decade of involvement with the Girl Scouts of the USA, Lewis participated in the United Nations’ 60th Annual Commission on the Status of Women in New York in March 2016. Lewis spoke at the UN again in October 2016 for the United Nations' International Day of the Girl Child, performing spoken word during the opening of the event; she also gave a speech during the proceedings.

Teen Vogue 
Lewis contributed to Teen Vogue in 2016 and 2017, focusing on black women, intersectional feminism, and perceptions and approaches to handling violence in Chicago. She addresses social justice, especially for people of color.

Awards 

 Pioneer Award, Chicago Foundation for Women, March 2017 
 Princeton Prize in Race Relations, April 2017 
 Rising Star award, DuSable Museum of African American History, June 2017

Publications and speeches 

 Eva Lewis articles on Teen Vogue website
 ABC 7 Chicago interview with Lewis on The I Project
 Eva Lewis Opening Performance, U.N. International Day of the Girl Child, 2016
 Eva Lewis Speech, U.N. International Day of the Girl Child, 2016
 Chicago: A Land of Wilderness and Oasis | Eva Lewis | TEDxTeen

References

External links 

 The I Project website
 Press release on July 11, 2016 youth march on Millennium Park
 Youth for Black Lives 
 Garcia, Tess, "Young Feminists are Leading the Fight for Black Lives in Chicago," Ms. Magazine, 4 April, 2018.
 Phillips, Daschell, "CPS denies travel aid to fair winner," Hyde Park Herald, 15 May 2013. 
 Ritzu, Julianna, "No Justice No Peace: How Eva Lewis is Transforming Youth Activism in Chicago," Payton Paw Print, 6 October 2016.

Activists for African-American civil rights
African-American feminists
Women civil rights activists
American feminists
People from Chicago
Activists from Illinois
Intersectional feminism
Race and society
Youth activists
Spoken word
Black Lives Matter people
American anti-racism activists
Living people
Year of birth missing (living people)